Vitis chunganensis is a species of climbing vine in the grape family native to China (Anhui, Fujian, Guangdong, Guangxi, Hunan, Jiangxi, and Zhejiang provinces). In Chinese it is called dong nan pu tao, or Southeast grape.

Habitats include forests and shrublands, hillsides and valleys, especially those where streams are present, between 500 and 1400 meters above sea-level. Flowers appear from April to June, producing very dark, purple, globose berries, about 1 cm in diameter, from June through to August.

It is traditionally used as folk medicine for the treatment of infectious hepatitis and physical
injury. It contains chunganenol which is a resveratrol hexamer.

References

chunganensis
Plants described in 1925
Flora of China